Glyn Moody is a London-based technology writer. He is best known for his book Rebel Code: Linux and the Open Source Revolution (2001). It describes the evolution and significance of the free software and open source movements with interviews of hackers.

His writings have appeared in Wired, Computer Weekly, Linux Journal, and Ars Technica. In 2009, he criticised the software education policy of the government of José Luís Rodríguez Zapatero on his blog.

Selective bibliography 

 Digital Code of Life: How Bioinformatics is Revolutionizing Science, Medicine, and Business by Glyn Moody (Hardcover - Feb 3, 2004) 
 Rebel Code: Linux and the Open Source Revolution  by Glyn Moody (Paperback - Jul 15, 2002) 
 The Internet with Windows  by Glyn Moody (Paperback - Jan 15, 1996)

References

External links 
 open... (blog)
 Open Enterprise blog

British technology writers
Living people
Year of birth missing (living people)